Al-Mubarrad (al-Mobarrad), or Abū al-‘Abbās Muḥammad ibn Yazīd (c. 826c. 898), was a native of Baṣrah.  He was a philologist, biographer and a leading grammarian of the School of Basra, a rival to the School of Kufa. In 860 he was called to the court of the Abbasid caliph al-Mutawakkil at Samarra. When the caliph was killed the following year, he went to Baghdād, and taught there until his death. 
 
A prolific writer, perhaps the greatest of his school, his best known work is Al-Kāmil ("The Perfect One" or "The Complete").

A leading scholar of Sībawayh's seminal treatise on grammar, "al-Kitab" ("The Book"), he lectured on philology and wrote critical treatises on linguistics and Quranic exegesis (tafsir).  He is said to be the source of the story of Shahrbanu or Shahr Banu — eldest daughter of Yazdegerd III.

His quote to would-be students was:

“Have you ridden through grammar, appreciating its vastness and meeting with the difficulties of its contents?"

Biography
Ishaq Al-Nadīm transmitted the written account of Abū al-Ḥusayn al-Khazzāz, who gives al-Mubarrad's full genealogical name: Muḥammad ibn Yazīd ibn ‘Abd al-Akbar ibn ‘Umayr ibn Ḥasanān ibn Sulaym ibn Sa‘d ibn ‘Abd Allāh ibn Durayd ibn Mālik ibn al-Ḥārith ibn ‘Āmir ibn Abd Allāh ibn Bilāl ibn ‘Awf ibn Aslam ibn Aḥjan ibn Ka‘b ibn al-Ḥarīth ibn Ka‘b ibn ‘Abd Allāh ibn Mālik ibn Naṣr ibn al-Azd, al-Azd said to be the son of al-Ghawth.

According to Sheikh Abū Sa‘īd al-Sīrāfī,  Abū al-‘Abbās Muḥammad ibn Yazīd al-Azdī al-Thumālī [al-Mubarrad] was a protégé of the grammarians al-Jarmī, al-Māzinī, etc.  He was descended from a branch of al-Azd, called the Thumālah.   He began studying Sībawayh's Book with al-Jarmī, but completed it with al-Māzinī, whose linguistic theories he developed. In a citation from the book called Device of the Men of Letters, al-Hakimi wrote that Abū ‘Abd Allah Muhammad ibn al-Qāsim called Al-Mubarrad a "Sūraḥūn", of al-Baṣrah.  His origins were in al-Yaman, however his marriage to a daughter of al-Ḥafṣā al-Mughannī earned him the name ‘Ḥayyan al-Sūraḥī.’ 

Abū Sa’īd reports al-Sarrāj  and Abū ‘Ali al-Ṣaffār that al-Mubarrad was born in 825-26 (210 AH)and died in 898-99 (285 AH), aged seventy-nine.  Others said his birth was in 822-23 (207 AH). Al-Ṣūlī Abū  Bakr Muhammad ibn Yahya said he was buried in the cemetery of the Kūfah Gate. 

Al-Mubarrad related many anecdotes of the poets, linguists and satirists of his circle. In one such tale al-Mubarrad says

“One day Abū Muḥallim al-Shaybānī  said to me, ‘I had never seen a mortar among the nomads, so that when I came across one, I was disdainful of it.’”
He estimated that “Abū Zayd knew a great deal about grammar, but less than al-Khalīl and Sībawayh." He described al-Aṣma’ī as "equal to Abu ‘Ubaydah in poetry and rhetoric but more expert in grammar, although ‘Ubaydah excelled in genealogy."

In another tradition al-Mubarrad read a poem of the poet Jarīr to a student of al-Aṣma‘ī and Abū ‘Ubaydah, called al-Tawwazī, in the presence of the poet’s great grandson Umārah, which began:
The dove was happy in the trees exciting me;
For a long time may thou tarry in the branches and the forest verdure,
until he came to the line
But the heart remaineth bound by longing
For Jumanah or Rayya, the Barren Place (al-‘Āqir).
When ‘Umārah asked al-Tawwazī how his master Abū ‘Ubaydah would interpret “Jumanah and Rayyā”, al-Tawwazī replied, “The names of two women,” ‘Umārah laughed saying, ‘These two, by Allāh, are two sandy places to the right and left of my house!' When al-Tawwazi asked al-Mubarrad to write this explanation down, he refused out of respect for Abū ‘Ubaydah. Al-Tawwazī insisted that if he were present, Abū ‘Ubaydah, would accept Umārah’s interpretation, as it was about his own house.’

Works
 Meaning of the Qur’ān;
Al-Kāmil (The Complete)
The Garden;
Improvisation;
Etymology;
Al-Anwā' and the Seasons;
Al-Qawāfī;
Penmanship and Spelling;
Introduction to Sībawayh;
The Shortened and the Lengthened Masculine and Feminine;
The Meaning of the Qur’ān, known as Kitāb al-Tāmm (Entirety);
Proving the Readings [methods of reading the Qur’ān];
Explanation of the Arguments of the “Book" of Sībawayh;
Necessity of Poetry;
The Training of an Examiner;
The Letters in the Meaning of the Qur’an to “Ṭā' (Ṭ) Ha‘(H);
The Meaning of the Attributes of Allāh, May His Name Be Glorified;
Praiseworthy and Vile;
Pleasing Gardens;
Names of the Calamities among the Arabs;
The Compendium (unfinished);
Consolation;
Embellishment;
Thorough Searching of the “Book” of Sībawayh;
Thorough Searching of “Kitab al-Awsaṭ" of al-Akhfash;
Prosody- An Explanation of the Words of the Arabs, Rescuing Their Pronunciation, Coupling of Their Words, and Relating Their Meaning;
How the Pronunciations of the Qur’ān Agree, Though Their Meanings Differ;
The Generations of the Grammarians of al-Baṣrah, with Accounts about Them;
The Complete Epistle;
Refutation of Sībawayh The Principles of Poetry;
Inflection (Declension) of the Qur’ān;
Exhortation for Morality and Truth;
Qaḥṭān and ‘Adnan [the basic Arab tribes];
The Excess Deleted from Sībawayh;
Introduction to Grammar;
Inflection (Declension);
The Speaker (The Rational Being);
Superior and Distinguished;
Explanation of the Names of Allah the Almighty;
The Letters;
Declension (Conjugation).

Transcribers of al-Mubarrad

The copyists Ismā’īl ibn Aḥmad Ibn al-Zajjājī and Ibrāhīm ibn Muḥammad al-Shāshī  were probably al-Mubarrad’s amanuenses.

Other contemporary grammarians wrote commentaries of lesser value on The Book of Sībawayh.
Among this group were:
Abū Dhakwān al-Qāsim ibn Ismā’īl, who wrote “The Meaning of Poetry”;
Abū Dhakwān’s stepson Al-Tawwazī.
‘Ubayd ibn Dhakwān Abū ‘Ali, among whose books there were Contraries, Reply of the Silencer, Oaths (Divisions) of the Arabians,
Abū Ya‘lā ibn Abī Zur‘ah, a friend of al-Māzinī, who wrote A Compendium of Grammar (unfinished) 

Al-Mubarrad‘s leading pupil al-Zajjāj became an associate of al-Qāsim, the vizier of the ‘Abbāsid caliph al-Mu‘taḍid (892-902), and tutor to the caliph’s children.  When al-Mu’taḍid was recommended the book Compendium of Speech by Muḥammad ibn Yaḥyā ibn Abi ‘Abbād, which was composed in the form of tables, the caliph ordered his vizier, al-Qāsim, to commission an expositionary commentary. Al-Qāsim sent first to Tha‘lab, who declined -offering instead to work on Kitāb al-‘Ayn of al-Khalīl- and then to al-Mubarrad, who in turn declined on grounds of age. Al-Mubarrad recommended his younger colleague al-Zajjāj for such a laborious task.
Al-Mubarrad had a close friendship with Ibn al-Sarrāj, one of his brightest and sharpest pupils. When al-Mubarrad died al-Sarrāj became a pupil of al-Zajjāj. Al Mubarrad taught Abū Muḥammad ‘Abd Allah ibn Muhammad ibn Durustūyah.  and Abū al-Ḥasan ‘Alī ibn ‘lsā al-Rummānī, wrote a commentary on the “Introduction" (Al-Madkhal) (on grammar) of al-Mubarrad.  Ibn al-Ḥā’ik Hārūn, from al-Ḥīrah, a grammarian of al-Kūfah, debated with al-Mubarrad.  A conversation between al-Mubarrad and Ibn al-Ḥā’ik is related by al-Nadīm were al-Mubarrad says to Ibn al-Ḥā’ik, “I notice that you are full of understanding, but at the same time free from pride." Ibn al-Ḥā’ik replied, “Oh, Abū al-‘Abbas, it is because of you that Allāh has provided our bread and livelihood.” Then al-Mubarrad said, “In spite of receiving your bread and livelihood, you would be proud if you had a proud nature."
   
Al-Nadīm also relates a tradition from Abū ‘Ubayd Allāh that Muḥammad ibn Muḥammad had related that Abū al-‘Abbas Muhammad ibn Yazid [al-Mubarrad] the grammarian had said:
“I never saw anyone more avaricious for learning than al-Jāḥiẓ, al-Fatḥ  ibn Khāqān, and Ismā’īl ibn Isḥaq al-Qāḍī (Judge). Whatever book came into the hands of al-Jāḥīẓ, he read it from cover to cover, while al-Fatḥ carried a book in his slipper and if he left the presence of Caliph al-Mutawakkil to relieve himself or to pray, he read the book as he walked and returned to his seat. As for Ismā’īl ibn Isḥaq, whenever I went in to him there was in his hand a book which he was reading, or else he was turning over some books so as to choose one of them to read.

Notes

References

Bibliography
 
 
 
 
 
 
 
 
 
 
 
 
 
 
 
 
 
 
 
 
 
 
 
 
 
 
 
 
 
 
 
 

826 births
898 deaths
9th-century Arabs
9th-century Arabic writers
9th-century jurists
9th-century linguists
9th-century philologists
Scholars from the Abbasid Caliphate
Arab grammarians
Baghdad under the Abbasid Caliphate
Grammarians of Arabic
Grammarians of Basra
Medieval grammarians of Arabic
People from Basra
Philologists of Arabic
Quranic exegesis scholars